Pulki  is a village in the administrative district of Gmina Końskowola, within Puławy County, Lublin Voivodeship, in eastern Poland.

The village has a population of 137.

References

Pulki